Luigi Brunella (14 April 1914 – 23 May 1993) was an Italian football defender and manager from Garlasco. He spent the largest majority of his playing career at Torino and Roma (where he played over 150 games), before going on to management, taking over at clubs such as Roma.

Honours
Torino
Coppa Italia: 1935–36

Roma
Serie A: 1941–42

References

1914 births
1993 deaths
Italian footballers
Association football defenders
Serie A players
Torino F.C. players
A.S. Roma players
Juventus F.C. players
A.S. Roma managers
Italian football managers